Ronald Henry Anderson (born January 21, 1950) is a Canadian former professional ice hockey right winger who played one season in the National Hockey League for the Washington Capitals and four seasons in the American Hockey League for the Boston Braves, Richmond Robins and New Haven Nighthawks.

Playing career
Anderson played collegiate hockey for two years at Boston University where he registered 87 points in 62 games for the Terriers. Anderson's scoring touch with BU didn't go unnoticed by the Boston Bruins who signed him as a free agent in 1972. He would play 2 seasons with their AHL affiliate the Boston Braves in 1972–73 and 1973–74. The NHL expanded by two teams in 1974–75, adding teams in Kansas City, Missouri and Washington, D.C. The expansion Washington Capitals selected him 34th from the Boston Bruins in the 1974 NHL Expansion Draft. He played 28 games during their inaugural season, tallying 9 goals and 7 assists for 16 points. He also spent time that year with the Richmond Robins, the AHL affiliate of the Philadelphia Flyers. After one more season in the minors Anderson headed to Europe and won a 2nd league title with Villacher SV followed by one more season on Wiener EV before retiring as a player in 1978.

Coaching
Anderson continued his hockey career, turning almost immediately to coaching when he became a mid-season replacement for the Welland Steelers. In 1980–81 he joined the staff at Merrimack as an assistant and was picked as the replacement for Bruce Parker on the eve of the Warriors' return to Division I. After finishing as runner-up in the last Division II championship for 8 years, Anderson led Merrimack as a concurrent D-I independent and ECAC East member for the next five years as it tried to find a permanent home. Despite the difficulties of not being in a major conference the Warriors steadily improved until they compiled a magnificent 34-win season in 1987–88, the best in the history of the school (as of 2016). Their performance couldn't have come at a better time because the NCAA expanded the playoff and Anderson's team became the first independent squad invited to the postseason since 1960. Not satisfied with simply making the cut, Merrimack dropped the first game to Hockey East champion Northeastern before routing them in the second game to take the opening series 10-8 on aggregate. In the quarterfinals they defeated eventual champion Lake Superior State 4-3 in the first game before their luck ran out and the Warriors were drubbed 5-0 to lose the series.

After another stellar season Merrimack was finally accepted into a major conference, joining Hockey East for the 1989–90 season. Their winning ways, however, didn't continue with their new, full-Division-I schedule. Anderson's team won only 10 games that campaign and would improve only marginally over the next few years. For their first nine seasons in Hockey East the Warriors would come close but never achieve a winning season. Between 1990 and 1997 Anderson was unable to get a single postseason series victory, going 1-9 in the Hockey East tournament. In 1998, however, they shocked the conference by defeating his top-ranked alma mater Boston University twice to reach the semifinals. Before the second round began Anderson was told that his contract would not be renewed and the 7-2 loss to Boston College turned out to be his last game behind the bench.

Management
Anderson accepted a position as an amateur scout for the Chicago Blackhawks in 1999 and served in that capacity for 9 seasons before being named Director of Player Recruitment in 2008. Anderson continues to serve in that capacity as of 2017 and has seen his name etched on the Stanley Cup three times as a result (2010, 2013 and 2015).

Awards and achievements
 1972–73 – Dudley "Red" Garrett Memorial Award (AHL Rookie of the year)
 1972–73 – AHL Second Team All-Star
 2010 Stanley Cup (Chicago Blackhawks)
 2013 Stanley Cup (Chicago Blackhawks)
 2015 Stanley Cup (Chicago Blackhawks)

Career statistics

Regular season and playoffs

Head coaching record

^ Maine was required to retroactively forfeit two victories against Merrimack which are reflected here.

Transactions
 Signed as a free agent by the Boston Bruins, June, 1972.
 Claimed from the Boston Bruins by the Washington Capitals in the 1974 NHL Expansion Draft, June 12, 1974.
 Traded by the Washington Capitals with Bob Gryp to the New Haven Nighthawks (AHL) for Rich Nantais and Alain Langlais, February 23, 1976.

References

External links

1950 births
Living people
Boston Braves (AHL) players
Boston University Terriers men's ice hockey players
Canadian ice hockey right wingers
Chicago Blackhawks scouts
Ice hockey people from New Brunswick
New Haven Nighthawks players
Richmond Robins players
Sportspeople from Moncton
Undrafted National Hockey League players
Washington Capitals players
NCAA men's ice hockey national champions